Game On is a British sitcom which ran for three series on BBC2 from 27 February 1995 to 6 February 1998.

The central characters are three childhood friends from Herne Bay in Kent; laddish agoraphobe Matthew Malone (Ben Chaplin in the first series and Neil Stuke in the second and third), man-eater Amanda "Mandy" Wilkins (Samantha Janus) and wimpish Martin Henson (Matthew Cottle). In their twenties, the trio move into and share a flat in Battersea, south-west London, which Matthew bought with his inheritance, and the series follows their lives as flatmates.

Created and written by Andrew Davies and Bernadette Davis, and produced by Hat Trick Productions for the BBC, Game On was aimed at twenty-somethings, the same age group as the principal cast of the show.

Production
The title, derived from a stock screen term used by 1980s early computer video games to initiate a competitive encounter, was taken from English urban slang speech of the 1990s' lad culture of which the principal character Matthew Malone was an exemplar. It was directed by John Stroud, produced by Sioned Wiliam and the BBC Television Head of Comedy Geoffrey Perkins, and executive produced by Denise O'Donohue on behalf of Hat Trick Productions for the BBC.

After a successful first series, the production suffered somewhat from the loss of its lead player Ben Chaplin, who left the cast unexpectedly after receiving an offer of a film role in Hollywood on the back of his performance in the series. He was replaced for series 2 and 3 by Neil Stuke. (The change of actor was indirectly acknowledged in Stuke's first episode, when the other characters complained about the recasting of a main character in Roseanne and expressed their dislike for TV shows which did this). The first two series were written by Andrew Davies and Bernadette Davis, while Davis wrote the final series alone.

The show's theme tune was "Where I Find My Heaven" by the Gigolo Aunts. The single reached number 29 in the UK singles chart in May 1995 when the series debuted. Among other music included was "Dogs of Lust" by The The, "Screamager" by Therapy?, "From Despair to Where" by Manic Street Preachers, "Girls & Boys" by Blur, "God! Show Me Magic" by Super Furry Animals, "The View From Here" by Dubstar and Oasis.

A fourth series was considered. Bernadette Davis voiced her desire to focus the next series on the development of Matthew, who due to his flat-bound existence, she began to find increasingly hard to write for; the addition of a "radicalist" new gay or lesbian housemate was also part of her suggestions to add a new element of interest to the series. However, despite a continuity announcer stating over the closing credits of the final episode in a 1999 rerun that the series would return the following year, only one further repeated episode was broadcast the following year, and a fourth series never emerged.

Characters

Matthew Norman Malone (Chaplin for the first series, subsequently Stuke) – Matthew is the unemployed owner of the three-bedroomed flat in which the show mostly takes place, and which he hardly ever goes outside of. From Herne Bay and a self-proclaimed ladies' man, the car accident which killed his parents has left him with a significant inheritance - part of which he spent on buying the Battersea flat, which means he does not have to work - but also resulted in a deep fear of the outside world and acute agoraphobia. Although Matt still keeps a surfboard in pristine condition, routinely waxing it, even passing beyond the front door causes a panic attack. He passes the days alone in the flat whilst the others are at work by dressing up, role-playing and spying on the neighbours. Routinely makes up wild and implausible stories about his past and what he has been up to through the day whilst the others have been at work. Loves to use the word "tosser" and the phrase "double hard bastard" and in an ongoing gag throughout the entire series would mock his flatmate Martin for being ginger and force him to make endless cups of tea. Despite describing himself as a "double hard bastard," he secretly enjoys things that could be characterized as "effeminate," such as 1940s "love story" movies and Emmerdale when not watching Reservoir Dogs or Bikini Beach Babes on Safari.
Martin Henson (Cottle) – Martin is a passive and meek tangerine-haired bank clerk who lives on his mother's frozen meals. Matthew's oldest "friend" (in truth Matt picked on Martin even at school), Martin's older sister is Claudia, Mandy's best friend, and by extension, although being two years younger than Mandy has known Mandy since they were kids. Martin is still a virgin in the beginning of the series, and although he doesn't remain one, he remains forever unlucky in love, like Mandy. Martin is Matthew's slave, doormat and constant source of entertainment, whom he calls "ginger tosser" whilst screaming for Martin to make cups of tea. Years of passive abuse have left Martin scared of Matt, although he still looks up to him as a "cool guy" and hopes for the day he will go back outside. Although not agoraphobic like Matt, Martin also has no social life outside work, and has made a threadbare trail from his seat to the kettle.
Amanda "Mandy" Wilkins (Janus) – Mandy is an ambitious yet underachieving career girl who finds herself going nowhere except to bed with an endless stream of men (Northern by preference). Many of the men she sleeps with, she is not particularly attracted to, and there are hints throughout the series that she is simply addicted to sex (she tries during the second series to abstain from sex entirely). In early episodes there were running gags involving Mandy's history of childhood bedwetting (which did not cease until she was 13). She made out with her science teacher at school, getting him the sack and causing his marriage to break down, and also as a teenager had a child in secret with her boyfriend, Stoat, that she couldn't cope with and gave up for adoption. Despite having an IQ of 139 and earning a degree at University, Mandy is stuck in a cycle of temporary, insignificant secretarial jobs, often with lecherous bosses. She gets into debt far too often and envies her best friend Claudia Henson, who did the same things as Mandy but is now going places.
Clare Monaghan (Tracy Keating) – An Irish nurse, Clare is Martin's girlfriend in the second series and then his ex. She meets Martin and initially makes a deal with him to lose her virginity, not knowing that he was also a virgin. They start dating and eventually break up due to Martin's inability to trust her around other men, his almost vegetative state, and irreconcilable life paths - Clare wanted to travel the world while Martin did not. She appears in five episodes of series two, and four episodes of series three. Actress Tracy Keating also makes a further appearance in the final episode as a different character, a woman who Martin pursues because she looks like Clare. Keating plays this part with an English accent.
Archie Glenister (Crispin Bonham-Carter) – Mandy's boss, lover and groom-to-be in the third series. Born into a wealthy, upper-class and snobbish family, Archie never really fitted in at home and worried his parents with his disturbing taxidermy obsession, which later also scares Mandy.  Despite his privileged background, Archie is a fun-loving, rough-and-tumble guy who spent time in the Royal Marines (unlike Matthew, who merely claims he has). In the final episode Archie is killed in a car crash on the day of his wedding to Mandy.
Jason (Mark Powley) – Mandy's friend from college, the one she never had sex with due to him being gay. A psychotherapist, he poses as Mandy's cousin to try to help Matt overcome his agoraphobia. Appears in three consecutive episodes of series two, during which he falls in love with a completely oblivious Matthew.

List of one-off characters
Marco (Oliver Haden) – Mandy's Italian tutor, whom she struggles to resist during her short-lived dabble with celibacy. Appears in two consecutive episodes of series two.
Stoat (Eddie Marsan) – A criminal, and Mandy's ex-boyfriend from school. Appears in only one episode, during which he takes everybody in the flat hostage and is later revealed to have fathered Mandy's daughter whom she gave up for adoption when she was a teenager.
Claudia Henson (Rebecca Lacey) – Martin's older sister, and Mandy's best friend.  Although frequently referred to throughout all three series, she actually only appears in one episode of the first series, when she and Mandy go clubbing, and never shares any scenes with Martin.
Wally Bazoum - An unseen character, Mr Bazoum is Martin's only other friend except Matthew. Mr Bazoum is a Turkish man who also works at the bank where Martin works. The character is referred to in all series, and spoken to by Matthew who says "he sounds like a complete wanker". Spends a weekend away with Martin in the first series.
Dennis and Ursula - Two further unseen characters referenced throughout the show, they are an elderly couple who live in the flat next door. Notably, Martin borrows their rusted, unsightly Nissan to drive Mandy to church on her wedding day.
Paul "The Rage" Johnson (David Harewood) - A middleweight boxer whom Mandy dates in Big Wednesday. He is famous, rich, and successful. Matthew feels threatened by him but does not have the nerve to say anything, even when he puts his cold beer on his surfboard.

Episodes

Reception
The Digital Fix noted that viewing figures for the show were highest during its first series with Ben Chaplin as the lead actor, and the audience for the subsequent series declined sharply when he was replaced by Neil Stuke. The British Comedy Guide noted in its review of Game On that the series was polarizing due to some controversy over some of the politically incorrect dialogue, situations and gags, but also that the series had high viewing figures, building up an even bigger following after its cancellation.

Awards
Game On was nominated for Best Comedy (Programme or Series) at the 1997 BAFTAs, along with Absolutely Fabulous and Father Ted; the category was won by Only Fools and Horses.

DVD releases
All three series of the show are available on DVD. The first series DVD is the only one with any special features, which include Chaplin's best moments as Matthew Malone from the first series and character photo galleries.

References

External links

Game On at Hat Trick Productions Website

1995 British television series debuts
1998 British television series endings
1990s British sitcoms
1990s sex comedy television series
Agoraphobia in fiction
Battersea
BBC television sitcoms
British sex comedy television series
Casual sex in television
English-language television shows
Infidelity in television
Television shows written by Andrew Davies
Television series by Hat Trick Productions
Television shows set in London
Virginity in television